The 4721st Air Defense Group is a discontinued group of the United States Air Force. Its last assignment was with the 4700th Air Defense Wing at Larson Air Force Base, Washington, where it was last active in 1959.

The group was formed to provide a single command and support organization for the two fighter interceptor squadrons of Air Defense Command (ADC), that were tenants at Larson, a Tactical Air Command (TAC) base.  It was discontinued after the 322d Fighter-Interceptor Squadron moved in 1959, leaving only a single fighter squadron at Larson.

History
The 4721st Air Defense Group was organized in December 1956 at Larson Air Force Base, Washington to centralize supervision and support of the 322d Fighter-Interceptor Squadron (FIS) and the 538th FIS. Both squadrons were already stationed at Larson, flying radar equipped and Mighty Mouse rocket armed North American F-86D Sabre interceptor aircraft, and assigned directly to the 9th Air Division. The 4721st was a tenant of Tactical Air Command (TAC)'s 62d Air Base Group (ABG), the host organization at Larson.

In July 1957, the base transferred from TAC to Military Air Transport Service, although the 62d ABG remained the host unit. In the summer of 1957, both the 322d FIS and the 538th FIS upgraded to later model Sabres equipped with data link to tie them directly into the Semi-Automatic Ground Environment command and control system. About June 1958, the 538th FIS converted to Lockheed F-104 Starfighters, armed with the M61 Vulcan 20mm rotary cannon and AIM-9 Sidewinder missiles.

In April 1959, the 322nd FIS moved to Kingsley Field, Oregon and was reassigned out of the group as part of ADC's drawdown at Larson. The following month, the 4721st was discontinued and its remaining squadron, the 538th FIS, was assigned directly to the 4700th Air Defense Wing.

Lineage
 Designated as the 4721st Air Defense Group and organized on 1 December 1956
 Discontinued on 1 May 1959

Assignments
 9th Air Division, 1 December 1956
 25th Air Division, 15 August 1958
 4700th Air Defense Wing, 1 September 1958 – 1 May 1959

Components
 322d Fighter-Interceptor Squadron, 1 December 1956 – 1 April 1959
 538th Fighter-Interceptor Squadron, 1 December 1956 – 1 May 1959

Stations
 Larson Air Force Base, Washington, 1 December 1956 – 1 May 59

Aircraft
 F-86D 1956–1957
 F-86L 1957–1959
 F-104A 1958–1959

Commanders
 Col. Louis W. Ford, unknown – ca. 30 June 1958
 Lt Col. John E. Gaffnery, ca. 1 July 1958 – unknown

See also
 List of United States Air Force Aerospace Defense Command Interceptor Squadrons
 List of Sabre and Fury units in the US military
 List of Lockheed F-104 Starfighter operators

References

Notes

Bibliography

Further reading
 

Air defense groups of the United States Air Force
Aerospace Defense Command units
Four digit groups of the United States Air Force
Military units and formations established in 1956
Military history of Washington (state)
Military units and formations disestablished in 1959
1956 establishments in Washington (state)
1959 disestablishments in Washington (state)